"Søndagsbarn" is a single by Danish hip hop group Suspekt featuring vocals from Danish band Lukas Graham. The song was released as a digital download in Denmark on 22 May 2015 through Tabu Records. The song peaked at number three on the Danish Singles Chart.

Track listing

Chart performance

Weekly charts

Release history

References

2015 songs
2015 singles
Lukas Graham songs
Song articles with missing songwriters
Tabu Records singles